Tybroughney, statutory spelling Tibberaghny, is a civil parish in the barony of Iverk, County Kilkenny in Ireland. The parish comprises a single townland, also called Tibberaghny. It lies on the north bank of the River Suir facing County Waterford, while the Lingaun river separates it from County Tipperary to the west.

Name
The name Tiobra Fhachna means "well of Saint Fachtna", who was at Lismore Abbey in the seventh century. Various anglicised spellings include Tibberaghny, Tiberaghny, Tipperaghny, Tybroughney, Tyburoughny, Tibroughny, Tybrachny.

History
Saint Fachtna's well, the holy well from which the townland is named, lies near the ruined former parish church. Saint Modomnoc reputedly lived as a hermit in the area in the sixth century, and a pattern was celebrated there on 13 February, his feast day.  The church was built before the Norman invasion of Ireland, and the parish formerly belonged to the Diocese of Lismore rather than the Diocese of Ossory. A pillar in the churchyard is carved in the style of a Celtic high cross, of which it may be a remnant.  In the Church of Ireland the parish was united to Whitechurch parish by 1821, and in 1833 both were among five civil parishes in the benefice of Fiddown. In the Irish Catholic church it is part of Templeorum parish.

The site is at the limit of access upstream on the Suir for medieval sea-going vessels. A Viking settlement here was destroyed in 980. Prince John of England built a castle here in 1185, shortly after the Norman invasion, to guard the northern border of Waterford. John's castle may have been built on the site of the extant Tybroughney Castle built in the 15th century, or a motte-and-bailey on a now-empty height near by. The parish was in County Tipperary as late as 1536, but had been transferred to County Kilkenny by 1649.

Population
Censuses recorded population by townland until 1911.

Transport
The section of the N24 road between Carrick-on-Suir and Piltown runs through the north of the townland. Further south is the Limerick–Rosslare railway line, between Carrick-on-Suir station and Waterford station. (The nearer station at Fiddown closed in 1964.)

Footnotes

References

Civil parishes of County Kilkenny
Townlands of County Kilkenny
Holy wells in Ireland